Plasmodium foleyi is a parasite of the genus Plasmodium subgenus Vinckeia. As in all Plasmodium species, P. foleyi has both vertebrate and insect hosts. The vertebrate hosts for this parasite are mammals.

Description 
This species was described by Buck, Coudurier and Quesnel in 1952. Its description was amended by Garnham and Uilenbe.

It was discovered in a splenectomised Lemur fulvus rufus in 1951 and it is named after Dr. H. Foley of the Pasteur Institute of Algeria.

The infected erythrocyte becomes enlarged.

Distribution 
This species is found in Madagascar.

Hosts 
The only known host is the lemur Lemur fulvus rufus.

References 

foleyi